James Edgar Atwell (3 June 1946 – 12 December 2020) was an English priest who was Dean of Winchester.

Life
He was educated at Dauntsey's and Exeter College, Oxford. He went to theological college at Cuddesdon and was ordained in 1971. He began his ordained ministry with a curacy at St John the Evangelist, East Dulwich after which he was curate at Church of St Mary the Great, Cambridge and Chaplain at Jesus College, Cambridge. He has a Master of Arts (MA Oxon) and a Bachelor of Divinity (BD).

From Cambridge he became Vicar of St Lawrence, Towcester and then Provost of St Edmundsbury Cathedral before becoming (automatically, due to the Cathedrals Measure) Dean of St Edmundsbury on 19 November 2000. Having received Letters Patent from Elizabeth II, he was installed in Winchester Cathedral at a service on Lady day, 25 March 2006.

On 12 February 2016, it was announced that Atwell was to retire as Dean of Winchester effective 14 July.

He died on 12 December 2020 at the age of 74.

Bibliography
Sources of the Old Testament: A Guide to the Religious Thought of the Hebrew Bible (Understanding the Bible & Its World), T. & T. Clark Ltd, 1 Apr 2004.

References

People educated at Dauntsey's School
Alumni of Exeter College, Oxford
Provosts and Deans of St Edmundsbury
Deans of Winchester
1946 births
2020 deaths